John Patrick Smiley (born March 17, 1965) is an American former Major League Baseball pitcher who played for four teams: the Pittsburgh Pirates, Minnesota Twins, the Cincinnati Reds and the Cleveland Indians in a twelve-year career from  to .

Early life
Smiley graduated from Perkiomen Valley High School in 1983, where he played sports as a baseball pitcher, basketball point guard, and football quarterback.

Career
Despite never playing minor league baseball higher than Class A, Smiley entered spring training before the 1987 season with a relief pitcher role already in place, with manager Jim Leyland saying he would have to "pitch his way off the club". In Smiley's first full season, he led the Pirates in appearances with 63 games.  Smiley was converted to a starting pitcher in 1988, lowering his earned run average by a full 2.5 runs per game, posting a 3.25 ERA and 13 wins against 11 losses.

On April 26, 1990, Smiley threw a complete game against the San Francisco Giants in 87 pitches, of which 73 were strikes, which remains a major league record for strike percentage in a single game. He allowed three hits and a single run, and struck out six batters, facing only three above the minimum.

In August 1995, Smiley surrendered a home run to Braves pitcher Tom Glavine — the only homer Glavine hit in his major league career. Shortly after, he was traded to the Indians by the Reds with Jeff Branson for Jim Crowell, Danny Graves, Damian Jackson and Scott Winchester. In 1997, Smiley broke his left humerus while warming up for a start; the injury ended his baseball career.

See also
 List of Major League Baseball annual wins leaders

References

External links
, or Retrosheet, or Pura Pelota (Venezuelan Winter League)

1965 births
Living people
Baseball players from Pennsylvania
Cincinnati Reds players
Cleveland Indians players
Gulf Coast Pirates players
Macon Pirates players
Major League Baseball pitchers
Minnesota Twins players
National League All-Stars
National League wins champions
Navegantes del Magallanes players
American expatriate baseball players in Venezuela
People from Phoenixville, Pennsylvania
Pittsburgh Pirates players
Prince William Pirates players
Sportspeople from Chester County, Pennsylvania